The Gibson ES-5 is a hollow-body electric guitar produced by the Gibson Guitar Corporation as part of the ES, or "Electric Spanish" series of guitars.

History
The ES-5 was intended to be an electric version of their popular Gibson L-5 acoustic jazz model. The ES-5 was introduced in 1949, and offered several innovative features which have become standard within the industry. The ES-5 was the first model of the ES-series to offer three pickups.  Unlike other multiple-pickup models of its era, the ES-5 used three different volume knobs (one for each pickup and one master tone) rather than a selector switch, to offer players improved control over their tone. The model was not as popular as other models of the ES-series, nor as popular as similar models by other manufacturers, such as the Epiphone Zephyr Emperor. In 1955 the model became the ES-5 Switchmaster, which incorporated a four-position selector switch, along with a new six-knob configuration, incorporating a volume and a tone knob for each pickup. The ES-5 Switchmaster was produced until 1962. It remained out of production until a 1995 reissue from the Gibson Custom division.  New models of the reissue are still available today. The original models used P-90 single coil pickups, but after 1957 the guitar used PAF humbucker pickups.

Notable users
 T-Bone Walker
 Lowell Fulson
 Roy Gaines
 J. Geils
 Wes Montgomery
 Carl Perkins
 B.B. King
 Frank Zappa
 Steve Howe (main guitar on Fragile)
 Kid Ramos
 Junior Watson
Dave Edmunds
Mark Knopfler
Jimmy Page
 Howard Gordon, guitarist of The Chuck Wagon Gang during the 1950s and 60s
Jimmy Nolen

References 

ES-5
Semi-acoustic guitars